9S may refer to :
 9S, Southern Air's IATA airline designator
 YoRHa No. 9 Type S, or 9S, a character in the video game Nier: Automata

See also
9 (disambiguation)
Nines (disambiguation)
S9 (disambiguation)